Wellyson Luiz de Oliveira Sobrau (born Mar 6, 1994), known as Wellyson, is a Brazilian professional footballer who plays as a defensive midfielder for Moto Club.

Wellyson played for Guarani FC in the Campeonato Paulista in 2013 and 2014.

References

Honours

Club

Tirana
 Albanian Supercup: (1) 2017

External links
 
 
 Wellyson at playmakerstats.com (English version of ogol.com.br)
 Dy përforcimet e orës së fundit të Tiranës
 e Tiranes per Europa League afrohet brazilianiWellyson

1994 births
Living people
Brazilian footballers
Brazilian expatriate footballers
Brazilian expatriate sportspeople in Romania
Expatriate footballers in Romania
Brazilian expatriate sportspeople in Albania
Expatriate footballers in Albania
Brazilian expatriate sportspeople in Sweden
Expatriate footballers in Sweden
Guarani FC players
CSM Ceahlăul Piatra Neamț players
Clube Atlético Taboão da Serra players
Rio Preto Esporte Clube players
Coimbra Esporte Clube players
KF Tirana players
AFC Eskilstuna players
Moto Club de São Luís players
Kategoria Superiore players
Superettan players
Campeonato Brasileiro Série D players
Sportspeople from Campinas
Association football midfielders